Ninh Binh–Hai PhongºQuang Ninh Expressway (Vietnamese: Đường cao tốc Ninh Bình–Hải Phòng–Quảng Ninh, labelled CT.09) is a partially completed expressway in Vietnam, running for 160 km connecting Ninh Binh to Quang Ninh. The route connects the northern coastal provinces of Vietnam with the North-South expressway.

Sections

Ninh Binh–Hai Phong
This  section is estimated to cost VND 10,000 billion and is currently in the financing stage.

Hai Phong–Ha Long
This section starts at Hai Phong, connecting to the Hanoi–Haiphong Expressway. It was built at a total investment cost of VND 25,000 billion. The government of Quang Ninh province invested 6,400 billion VND in this section, making it one of the first examples of regional government investment in expressways.

Ha Long–Van Don
The investment cost for this , four-lane section was VND 12,000 billion. It opened in December 2018. The toll amount was set at VND 2,100/km. The expressway currently ends at Van Don International Airport.

Van Don–Mong Cai
This section will run from Van Don Airport to the border with China at Móng Cái, totaling 80 km, with an investment cost of VND 11,195 billion, financed through a 19-year build-operate-transfer contract with a Sun Group daughter company. Travel time between the two termini will be shortened from 120 minutes to 50 minutes and the maximum speed will be 100 km/h, later modified to 120 km/h. Construction started in 2020 and is planned to be completed on 30 April 2022.

References

Expressways in Vietnam